The  1971 Monte Carlo Open – Men's singles was an event of the  1971 Monte Carlo Open tennis tournament. Željko Franulović was the defending champion but did not compete in this edition. Third-seeded Ilie Năstase won the singles title by defeating first-seeded Tom Okker 3–6, 8–6, 6–1, 6–1 in the final.

Seeds

Draw

Finals

Top half

Bottom half

References

External links
 ATP tournament profile
 ITF tournament edition details

Monte Carlo Singles